A number of steamships were named India, including -

, a P&O liner in service 1896-1915
SS India (1899), Operator: Sir Raylton Dixon & Co., Ltd., Middlesbrough; Operator: S. Costomeni & S. Valmadis, Syra; 2,933 tons  
, an Italian cargo ship sunk in 1942 by the German auxiliary cruiser Michel.

 
Notes
''

Ship names